Llanelly Tramways operated a tramway service in Llanelli between 1882 and 1908.

History
The Llanelly Tramways Order of 1880 authorised the construction of this short horse-drawn tramway in Llanelli. The line ran from Llanelli railway station to Woodend.

Closure
The horse-drawn tramways operated by the Llanelly Tramways were taken over by the Llanelly and District Electric Tramways in 1905 for £6,000.

References

3 ft gauge railways in Wales
Tram transport in Wales